Shanghai Bund (Chinese: 新上海滩) is a 2007 Chinese television series directed by Gao Xixi. It is a remake of the 1980 Hong Kong television series The Bund produced by TVB. The series stars Huang Xiaoming, Sun Li, Li Xuejian, Huang Haibo, Chen Shu and Sha Yi in the lead roles.

Cast

 Huang Xiaoming as Xua Wenqiang
 Sun Li as Feng Chengcheng
 Li Xuejian as Feng Jingyao
 Huang Haibo as Ding Lik
 Chen Shu as Fang Yanyun
 Sha Yi as Chen Hanlin
 Lu Jixian as Uncle Xiang
 Zhou Mingshan as Uncle Jiu
 Yin Yitong as Di
 Li Yixiao as Wang Yueqi
 Wang Chao as Li Wangqi
 Zong Xiaojun as Jin Dazhong
 Lu Ling as Yamaguchi Kaoriko
 Yu Bin as Lu Zhengqiu
 Li Jiyou as Changgui
 Zhang Zichen as Biao
 Ni Yilin as Ding Li's mother
 Song Linlin as Du Bang
 Li Yansheng as Chen Lianshan
 Liang Minghua as Morris
 Yi Han as Liu Ming
 Ji Gang as Heizi
 Fan Shide as Nie Renwang
 Yang Qiyu as Kun
 Zhang Yapeng as Bing
 Yao Jianming as Ōshima
 Chen Fu as Inspector Ma
 Yu Jianguo as Hengsan
 Chen Tao as Jie
 Sun Baohai as Lao'er
 Zhang Xiong as Uncle Yu
 Cao Yi as Luo Fu
 Yu Xin as Wang Hanhun
 Li Mingliang as Zhang Dasheng
 Gan Yong as Zenjirō

Soundtrack

References

External links
 Shanghai Bund on Sina

2007 Chinese television series debuts
2007 Chinese television series endings
The Bund (TV series)
Television series reboots
Mandarin-language television shows
Television shows set in Shanghai
Chinese period television series
Chinese action television series